FC Martve  is a Georgian women's football club based in Kutaisi. They play in the Georgia women's football championship.

The team finished the 2016 season as champion, and will play in the 2017–18 UEFA Women's Champions League qualifying round.

Honours
Georgia women's football championship 
  (2) 2016, 2017

Current squad
.

Head coach:  Paata Dograshvili

References

Martve
Martve